Shri Shankarlal Sundarbai Shasun Jain College for Women is an arts and science college located in Chennai, Tamil Nadu in southern India. It is affiliated with the University of Madras. It has been accredited with A Grade level by National Accreditation and Assessment Council (NAAC).

History
Sri Swetambar Stanakwasi Jain Educational Society (Regd.) was founded in the year 1937. 
Sri Shankarlal Sundarbai Shasun Jain College for Women is a unit of Sri S. S. Jain Educational Society.
The college was granted permission by the Govt. of Tamil Nadu by its G.O on 16 September 2004 and affiliation by the University of Madras on 18 May 2005.

Academics
The colleges offers 13 undergraduate and 3 postgraduate courses.

Course offered
SHIFT I (8.00 A.M -12.40 P.M)
	
School of Commerce
 B.Com. (Honours)	
 B.Com. (General)
 B.Com. (Accounting & Finance)
 B.Com. (Corporate Secretaryship)	
 M.Com. (Accounting & Finance)
 M.Phil. (Commerce)
	
School of Science
 B.Sc. (Computer Science)	
 B.Sc. (Mathematics)
 B.Sc. (Psychology)
 B.C.A.	

School of Management	
 BBA (Business Administration)
	
School of Media & Communication
 B.Sc. (Visual Communication)	
 M.A (Journalism and Communication)

SHIFT II (1.10 P.M -5.50 P.M)

School of Commerce
 B.Com. (General)
 B.Com. (Accounting & Finance)
 B.Com. (Corporate Secretaryship)
 B.Com. (Bank Management)
 B.Com. (Computer Applications)
 B.Com. (Information System Management)

School of Science
 B.C.A.  (Computer Applications)
 M.Sc. Computer Science
 M.Phil. (Computer science)

School of Religious Studies
 P.G Diploma in Jainology

 B.A English Literature

References

External links
 Official website
 Official website

Jain universities and colleges
Women's universities and colleges in Chennai
Arts and Science colleges in Chennai
Educational institutions established in 2005
2005 establishments in Tamil Nadu
Colleges affiliated to University of Madras